Sphaereupatorium is a genus of South American plants in the tribe Eupatorieae within the family Asteraceae.

Species
The only known species is Sphaereupatorium scandens, native to Bolivia and Brazil (Minas Gerais, D.F., Mato Grosso).

References

Eupatorieae
Monotypic Asteraceae genera
Flora of South America